The following is a list of international organization leaders in 2009.

UN organizations

Political and economic organizations

Financial organizations

Sports organizations

Other organizations

See also
List of state leaders in 2009
List of religious leaders in 2009
List of international organization leaders in 2008
List of international organization leaders in 2010

References

2009
2009 in international relations
Lists of office-holders in 2009